Sinobatis is a genus of rays in the family Anacanthobatidae native to deep water in the Indo-Pacific Ocean.

Species
Nine recognized species are in this genus:
 Sinobatis andamanensis Last & Bussarawit, 2016 (Andaman legskate) 
 Sinobatis borneensis (W. L. Y. Chan, 1965) (Borneo legskate)
 Sinobatis brevicauda Weigmann & Stehmann, 2016 (short-tail legskate) 
 Sinobatis bulbicauda Last & Séret, 2008 (western Australian legskate)
 Sinobatis caerulea Last & Séret, 2008 (blue legskate)
 Sinobatis filicauda Last & Séret, 2008 (eastern Australian legskate)
 Sinobatis kotlyari Stehmann & Weigmann, 2016 (Kotlyar's legskate) 
 Sinobatis melanosoma (W. L. Y. Chan, 1965) (black-bodied legskate)
 Sinobatis stenosoma (S. Li & A. S. Hu, 1982) (narrow leg skate)

References

Anacanthobatidae
Ray genera
Taxa named by P. Alexander Hulley